Burton Hardware Store, also known as Burton Brothers Hardware Store, was a historic commercial building located at Seaford, Sussex County, Delaware. It was built about 1900, and was a two-story, roughly square, frame structure.  It had a low-pitched roof and was partially sheathed in sheet metal imitations of rusticated cement blocks.  The front facade featured an elaborate pressed metal cornice.

The building was added to the National Register of Historic Places in 1978.  It was heavily damaged by fire in 2012 and then razed.

See also
National Register of Historic Places listings in Sussex County, Delaware

References

Commercial buildings on the National Register of Historic Places in Delaware
Commercial buildings completed in 1900
Buildings and structures in Sussex County, Delaware
Seaford, Delaware
National Register of Historic Places in Sussex County, Delaware